Chorlton is a stop on the South Manchester Line (SML) and Airport Line of the Metrolink light-rail system in Chorlton-cum-Hardy, Manchester, England. It was built as part of Phase 3a of the network's expansion, and opened on 7 July 2011 on a section of the former Cheshire Lines Committee railway.

History

Railway station

Chorlton-cum-Hardy railway station opened on 1 January 1880 by the Midland Railway on the Manchester South District Railway. It later became Cheshire Lines Committee and closed on 2 January 1967 as part of the Beeching Axe, though the line through Fallowfield remained open to freight until the 1980s. Until the mid-20th century the station yard supplied coal to the district. Land to the north-east of the track originally acquired for the purpose of doubling it was eventually sold off for development.

The station was mentioned in the 1964 song "Slow Train" by Flanders and Swann, which was written to lament the loss of stations resulting from the Beeching cuts:

Chorlton station was subsequently demolished and a Morrisons (originally Safeway) supermarket and car park built in its place, although the track bed remained extant to the side of the supermarket and part of one of the platforms survives next to the supermarket building. The route is run by Sustrans and forms part of Routes 6 and 60 of the National Cycle Network. The remaining Cheshire Lines Committee lines from Chorlton from Manchester Central towards Disbury remained disused and overgrown for another 10 years.

Manchester Metrolink station
Proposals to link Chorlton to a light rail system had been put forward since the 1980s, but remained unfunded for over 20 years. The extension that was originally proposed would have taken over the disused tracks of the Cheshire Lines Committee as far as East Didsbury.

In 2006, it was announced that the first phase of the "Big Bang" Metrolink expansion project (Phase 3A) would go ahead, including the extension to St Werburgh's Road. Following the rejection of the Greater Manchester Transport Innovation Fund in a public referendum in 2008, extension of the line to East Didsbury (Phase 3B) was completed with funding from national and local government.

Construction of the line began in April 2009 and it opened in July 2011. The first services towards East Didsbury began in June 2013.

Services

Chorlton is served by the three lines; Rochdale to East Didsbury, Shaw and Crompton to East Didsbury and Victoria to Manchester Airport. Each line operates at a frequency of one tram every 12 minutes providing a combined frequency of approximately one tram every 4 minutes in both directions. On the Rochdale to East Didsbury line, the last evening north-bound services (the last 2–3 dependent on day of week) terminate at Manchester Victoria.

Before the East Didsbury extension was completed in May 2013, southeast bound services terminated at St Werburgh's Road. An extension from there to Manchester Airport was opened on 3 November 2014. St Werburgh's road acts as the interchange station for services between the East Didsbury and Manchester Airport forks of the line. Northbound trams from Manchester Airport terminate at Victoria station.

Service pattern 
12 minute service to Manchester Victoria with single trams (every 20 minutes before 6 am)

Connecting bus routes
Chorlton station is served by several bus services either outside the stop or in Chorlton centre. Stagecoach Manchester service 85 both stop outside the stop and run eastbound to Manchester  the 85 terminates nearby at Chorlton bus station. Stagecoach/service 168 also stops outside and runs from Chorlton to Ashton-under-Lyne via Fallowfield, Longsight, Gorton and Droylsden. M travel  service 276, which also stops outside, runs to Withington Community Hospital and to Trafford General Hospital via Stretford.

Other services that stop nearby are Stagecoach service 24, which runs to Stockport and  MediaCityUK, Stagecoach services 23/23A/25, which also run to Trafford Centre and Stockport, and Stagecoach service 86, which runs to Manchester.

Gallery

References

 Butt, R. V. J. (1995) The Directory of Railway Stations. Sparkford: Patrick Stephens.

External links

 Metrolink stop information
 Chorlton area map
Manchester Metrolink Extension Project –  map of the plans (Urban Transport Technology)
Chorlton-cum-Hardy railway station in Disused Stations database

Tram stops in Manchester
Former Cheshire Lines Committee stations
Railway stations in Great Britain opened in 1880
Railway stations in Great Britain closed in 1967
Manchester South District Line
Railway stations in Great Britain opened in 2011
Beeching closures in England
Tram stops on the East Didsbury to Rochdale line
1880 establishments in England
1967 disestablishments in England
2011 establishments in England